The Synecdemus or Synekdemos is a geographic text, attributed to Hierocles, which contains a table of administrative divisions of the Byzantine Empire and lists of their cities. The work is dated to the reign of Justinian but prior to 535, as it divides the 912 listed cities in the Empire among 64 Eparchies. The Synecdemus, along with the work of Stephanus of Byzantium were the principal sources of Constantine VII's work on the Themes (De Thematibus). 

The Synecdemus was published in various editions beginning in 1735, notably by Gustav Parthey (Hieroclis Synecdemus; Berlin, 1866) and slightly later in a corrected text by A. Burckhardt in the Teubner series. The most recent major publication was by E. Honigmann (Le Synekdèmos d'Hiéroklès et l'opuscule géographique de Georges de Chypre; Brussels, 1939).

References

Sources 
 
 

 . (Oxford Dictionary of Byzantium)

Reference works in the public domain
Byzantine literature
6th-century books
6th-century manuscripts